The Madar (Ajmer)–Kolkata Express is an express train belonging to the North Western Railway zone that runs between  (MDJN) railway station of  and Kolkata Chitpur (KOAA) in India. It is currently being operated with 19607/19608 train numbers on a weekly basis.

Service

The 19608/Madar (Ajmer)–Kolkata Express has an average speed of 50 km/hr and covers 1998 km in 45h 50m The 19607/Kolkata–Madar Weekly Express has an average speed of 49 km/hr and covers 1998 km in 41h 50m.

Route & Halts 

The important halts of the train are:

Coach composition

The train now runs with LHB rakes with max speed of 110 kmph. The train consists of 19 coaches:

 1 AC II Tier
 4 AC III Tier
 8 Sleeper coaches
 4 General coaches 
 2 End-on Generator

Runs as a dedicated rake without rake sharing.
Single LHB rake belongs to North Western Railway (Ajmer) Division.

Traction

Direction reversal

The train reverses its direction 4 times:

See also 

 Kolkata railway station
 Madar Junction railway station
 Bhagalpur–New Delhi Weekly Superfast Express

Notes

References

External links 

 19607/Kolkata–Madar (Ajmer) Express India Rail Info
 19608/Madar (Ajmer)–Kolkata Express India Rail Info

Transport in Kolkata
Transport in Ajmer
Express trains in India
Rail transport in West Bengal
Rail transport in Madhya Pradesh
Rail transport in Rajasthan
Rail transport in Jharkhand
Rail transport in Uttar Pradesh
Railway services introduced in 2012